Teddy Hall may refer to:

 The nickname of St Edmund Hall, Oxford, one of the constituent colleges of the University of Oxford
 Edwin Hall (trade unionist) (1895–1961), British trade unionist
 Edward Thomas Hall (1924–2001), British scientist and balloonist, who exposed the Piltdown Man fraud

See also
Ted Hall (disambiguation)
Edward Hall (disambiguation)